Antonio Beretta (17 April 1808, in Milan – 14 November 1891) was the first mayor of Milan under the Kingdom of Italy from 1860 to 1867. He was appointed Senator for life by Victor Emmanuel II in 1862. He was a member of the Società Storica Lombarda. He died in Rome in 1891.

1808 births
1891 deaths
Mayors of Milan